Broćanac may refer to:

 Broćanac, Croatia, a village near Rakovica
 Broćanac, Neum, a village in Bosnia and Herzegovina
 Broćanac, Posušje, a village in Bosnia and Herzegovina